The Return of Maxim is a 1937 Soviet drama film directed by Grigori Kozintsev and Leonid Trauberg, the second part of trilogy about the life of a young factory worker, Maxim.

In July 1914, the Bolsheviks and Mensehviks compete for representation of the working-class in the Duma. Maksim, who just returned from exile, calls the workers to strike as a protest against the firing of six of their colleagues. The traitor Platon Dymba assaults Maksim, wounding him severely. When the strike unfolds the workers demonstrate by the thousands, the news of the outbreak of World War I suddenly arrives. Maksim gets drafted.

Cast
 Boris Chirkov - Maksim
 Valentina Kibardina - Natasha
 Anatoli Kuznetsov - Worker's Deputy Turayev
 Aleksandr Zrazhevsky - Vassili Kuzmich Yerofeyev, worker
 Aleksandr Chistyakov - Mishchenko, white-wooly mustached worker
 Vasili Vanin - Nikolai
 Yuri Tolubeyev - Loudmouthed Worker in Natasha's Office
 Aleksandr Bondi - Menshevik Troublemaker
 Mikhail Zharov - Platon Vassilievich Dymba
 Nikolai Kryuchkov		
 Vasili Merkuryev	
 Mikheil Gelovani	
 Stepan Kayukov	
 Leonid Lyubashevsky
 Maksim Shtraukh
 Mikhail Tarkhanov

References

External links
 
 Historical Dictionary of Russian and Soviet Cinema By Peter Rollberg

1937 films
Lenfilm films
Soviet black-and-white films
Films directed by Grigori Kozintsev
Films directed by Leonid Trauberg
Films scored by Dmitri Shostakovich
Articles containing video clips
Soviet drama films
1937 drama films

Films set in 1914
1930s Russian-language films